Riga is the capital of Latvia.

Riga may also refer to:

Geography 
In Latvia
Riga International Airport
Riga Cathedral, a church in Riga
Riga Castle, a building in Riga
Riga Black Balsam, an alcoholic drink in Latvia 
Elsewhere
Riga, New York, town in Monroe County, New York
Riga Academy, a house in Riga, New York 
Riga Township, Michigan, civil township of Lenawee County in the U.S. state of Michigan
Mount Riga (NYCRR station), former train station
Riga Assembly constituency in Bihar, India

Sports 
FK Rīga, a Latvian football club
HK Riga 2000, a Latvian ice hockey team
Riga Vanderer, defunct Latvian football club

Technology 
Riga class frigate, Soviet Navy class of frigates
Riga (moped) Moped, 1965–1992

Other
1796 Riga, an asteroid
RIGA Project, a United Nations project
, a number of ships with this name
Riga Mustapha, a Ghanaian football player
Riga (surname)

See also
Rizhsky (disambiguation)